In mathematics a p-group  is called power closed if for every section  of  the product of  powers is again a th power.

Regular p-groups are an example of power closed groups. On the other hand, powerful p-groups, for which the product of  powers is again a th power are not power closed, as this property does not hold for all sections of powerful p-groups.

References

Group theory
P-groups